There are many toll roads in the United States; , toll roads exist in 35 states, with the majority of states without any toll roads being in the West and South.

Most tolled facilities in the US today use an electronic toll collection system as an alternative to paying cash. Examples of this are the E-ZPass system used on most toll bridges, toll tunnels, and toll roads in the eastern U.S., as far south as Virginia, as far north as Maine, and as far west as Illinois; California's FasTrak; Florida's SunPass; Kansas's K-Tag; Oklahoma's Pikepass; Texas's TxTag (and within Texas, Houston's EZ Tag and Dallas's TollTag); Louisiana's GeauxPass; and Georgia's Peach Pass and Cruise Card.  Many toll roads have implemented open road tolling which eliminates the need to stop at toll booths.

Toll roads, especially near the East Coast, are often called turnpikes; the term turnpike originated from pikes, which were long sticks that blocked passage until the fare was paid and the pike turned at a toll house (or toll booth in current terminology).

Origins of funding through toll
In the mid to late nineteenth century, private toll road building was particularly active in the West including California and Nevada. The owners included stage companies, miners, and ranchers who built the roads, at least in part, to attract business for their primary investments.

Interstate Highway System

By 1956, most limited-access highways in the eastern United States were toll roads. In that year, the federal Interstate Highway System was established, funding non-toll roads with 90% federal dollars and 10% state match, giving little incentive for states to expand their turnpike systems. Funding rules initially restricted collections of tolls on newly funded roadways, bridges, and tunnels. In some situations, expansion or rebuilding of a toll facility using Interstate Highway funding resulted in the removal of existing tolls. This occurred in Virginia on Interstate 64 at the Hampton Roads Bridge-Tunnel when a second parallel roadway to the regional 1958 bridge-tunnel was completed in 1976.

Since the completion of the initial portion of the Interstate Highway System, regulations were changed, and portions of toll facilities have been added to the system. Some states are again looking at toll financing for new roads and maintenance, to supplement limited federal funding. In some areas, new road projects have been completed and later maintained with public-private partnerships funded by tolls, also known as build-operate-transfer systems. One such public-private partnership was the constructions of the Pocahontas Parkway near Richmond, Virginia, which features a costly high level bridge over the shipping channel of the James River and connects Interstate 95 with Interstate 295 to the south of the city.

Toll avoidance

A practice known as shunpiking (not to be confused with toll evasion, which is the non payment of tolls at a toll booth or concealment of a toll RFID tag at a toll reader, both violations) evolved which entails finding another route for the specific purpose of avoiding payment of tolls.

In some situations where the tolls were increased or felt to be unreasonably high, informal shunpiking by individuals escalated into a form of boycott by regular users, with the goal of applying the financial stress of lost toll revenue to the authority determining the levy.

One such example of shunpiking as a form of boycott occurred at the James River Bridge in eastern Virginia. After years of lower than anticipated revenues on the narrow privately funded structure built in 1928, the  Commonwealth of Virginia finally purchased the facility in 1949. However, rather than announcing a long-expected decrease in tolls, the state officials increased the rates in 1955 without visibly improving the roadway, with the notable exception of building a new toll plaza.

The increased toll rates incensed the public and business users alike. In a well-publicized example of shunpiking, Joseph W. Luter Jr., head of Smithfield Packing Company, the producer of world-famous Smithfield Hams, ordered his truck drivers to take a different route and cross a smaller and cheaper bridge. Despite the boycott by Luter and others,  tolls continued for 20 more years. They were finally removed from the old bridge in 1975 when construction began on a toll-free replacement structure.

See also 
 Public-private partnerships in the United States

References

Further reading
Daniel B. Klein, The Voluntary Provision of Public Goods? The Turnpike Companies of Early America, Economic Inquiry 28 (October 1990), 788-94.
Daniel B. Klein and Chi Yin, Use, Esteem, and Profit in Voluntary Provision: Toll Roads in California, 1850–1902, Economic Inquiry 34 (October 1996), 680-92.

External links
International Bridge, Tunnel and Turnpike Association (Association of User Financed Transportation Organizations)
Turnpikes and Toll Roads in Nineteenth-Century America (EH.Net Economic History encyclopedia)
National Alliance Against Tolls (British anti toll group, but "News" pages includes USA and other countries.)